A list of films produced in Russia in 1997 (see 1997 in film).

1997

See also
 1997 in Russia

External links

1997
Russia
Films